Cinema Petit is Detroit's first international cell phone film festival celebrating a new tool for film and image-making: the cell phone. The festival, run by graduate students from Wayne State University, invites the world to look at and partake in the enormous possibilities that cellular media offers.

About
In 1949's "A Dialectic Approach to Film Form," Soviet director and film theorist Sergei Eisenstein wrote that the filmic shot is not an "element" of montage, but a "cell." In the seventy-eight years following, our understanding of film and editing has dramatically changed, but the concept of "cell" has a new significance today. With the arrival of new cellular technologies and imaging devices, we enter the hypermodern era.

Much like Dziga Vertov's Kino-eye, the cellular eye is ready to capture daily life. Connected to and connecting the world through mobile phones, making the moving image truly mobile. Cinema Petit encourages the growth and expansion of new genres.

References

External links
 Cinema Petit
 The Brian Lehrer Show: Cell Phone Films
 CELLuloid: Cell Phone-Made Documentaries at MOMA, NY
 Cell Phone Art at the Contemporary Museum, Baltimore, MD
 Pocket Film Festival, FR

Film festivals in Michigan
Wayne State University
Festivals in Detroit